Mukkuvane Snehicha Bhootham is a 1978 Indian Malayalam film,  directed by J. Sasikumar. The film stars M. G. Soman, Jayan, Nellikode Bhaskaran, Janardanan, Jayabharathi , KPAC Lalitha, Manavalan Joseph and Sreelatha Namboothiri in the lead roles. The film has musical score by K. J. Joy.

Cast

M. G. Soman as Rajan
Jayan as Krishnan Kutty
Janardanan as Lopez
KPAC Lalitha as Chirutha
Manavalan Joseph as Bhootham
Sreelatha Namboothiri as Karthu
Unni Mary as Ambili
Kaduvakulam Antony
Nellikode Bhaskaran as Keshavan
Vettoor Purushan
Kollam G. K. Pillai

Soundtrack
The music was composed by K. J. Joy and the lyrics were written by Anwar Suber.

References

External links
 

1978 films
1970s Malayalam-language films
Films directed by J. Sasikumar